The Men's marathon 5-6 was a wheelchair marathon event in athletics at the 1988 Summer Paralympics. The race was won by Jonathon Puffenberger.

Results

See also
 Marathon at the Paralympics

References 

Men's marathon 5-6
1988 marathons
Marathons at the Paralympics
Men's marathons